The Chevron B8 is a lightweight sports racing car, designed, developed and built by British manufacturer Chevron Cars, in 1968. It is homologated in the Prototype category of the International Automobile Federation. It won thirty-six races during its various engagements. Only 44 cars were built.

Technical
It was powered by the different four-cylinder engines; including a Ford-Cosworth FVA, a BMW M10, and a Coventry Climax FPF.

Racing history
The B8 entered the competition for the first time in 1967, on the occasion of the Danube Cup. Digby Martland finished sixth overall behind the wheel 4.

The Chevron B8 actively contested in racing competitions until 1986. Over its career, spanning 10 years, it won a total of 52 races, and scored 127 podium finishes, took 18 fastest race laps, and won 45 races in its class, respectively.

References

Chevron racing cars
Sports prototypes
24 Hours of Le Mans race cars
Group 4 (racing) cars
Sports racing cars